The Colorado Department of Labor and Employment (CDLE) connects job seekers with great jobs, provides an up-to-date and accurate picture of the economy to help decision making, assists workers who have been injured on the job, ensures fair labor practices, helps those who have lost their jobs by providing temporary wage replacement through unemployment benefits, and protects the workplace — and Colorado communities — with a variety of consumer protection and safety programs.

Structure 
CDLE is a principal department of the Colorado state government. CDLE is composed of:

 The Division of Employment and Training manages the Connecting Colorado website and one-stop career centers. The Colorado Workforce Development Council is responsible for workforce development and oversight of federal Workforce Investment Act of 1998 funds.

 The Division of Unemployment Insurance administers unemployment insurance, a temporary and partial wage replacement to workers who have become unemployed through no fault of their own.

 The Division of Labor Standards and Statistics administers laws and regulations governing wages, minimum wage, youth employment, certain union issues and grievances, and employment-related immigration laws.

 The Division of Oil and Public Safety regulates storage and use of fuel products and explosives and the safe operation of amusement rides, boilers and conveyances.

 The Division of Workers' Compensation administers workers' compensation, disability and medical benefits to injured workers.

 The Division of Vocational Rehabilitation provide a wide variety of individualized services for people with disabilities to reach employment goals.

 The Division of Family and Medical Leave Insurance will ensure all Colorado workers have access to paid leave in order to take care of themselves or their family during life circumstances that pull them away from their jobs — like growing their family or taking care of a loved one with a serious health condition.

 The Office of Just Transition's purpose is to support coal workers, employers, and communities as they plan for the future closings of coal plants upon which their communities depend.

 The Office of New Americans Initiative will identify and address issues related to integration, foster enhanced inclusion of New Americans in Colorado's civic, social, and economic life, and ensure equitable opportunities for newcomers.

 The Office of the Future of Work, created by an Executive Order from Governor Polis on September 4, 2019, also seeks to raise awareness about the future of work.

References

External links 
 

Labor and Employment